Cassandra Miller (born Metchosin, British Columbia, Canada, 1976) is a Canadian experimental composer currently based in London, England. Her work is known for frequently utilising the process of transcription of a variety of pre-existing pieces of music.

She has been widely commissioned by international orchestras, ensembles and soloists, and has won the Jules Léger Prize for New Chamber Music twice, in 2016 and in 2011. In 2019, writers of The Guardian ranked her Duet for cello and orchestra (2015) the 19th greatest work of art music since 2000, with Kate Molleson writing, "Miller is a master of planting a seed and setting in motion an entrancing process, then following through with the most sumptuous conviction."

Since 2018 she has been Professor of Composition at the Guildhall School of Music and Drama in London, UK.

Education 
Miller studied with Christopher Butterfield at the University of Victoria (2005) and at the Royal Conservatory of the Hague (2008) with Richard Ayres and Yannis Kyriakides before studying privately with Michael Finnissy in 2012.

Miller returned to academic research in 2014, as a PhD candidate at the University of Huddersfield, supervised by Dr Bryn Harrison and supported by the Jonathan Harvey Scholarship.

Career 
Miller's music has been commissioned and performed by orchestras including BBC Scottish Symphony Orchestra, the Oslo Philharmonic, the Toronto Symphony Orchestra and the Winnipeg Symphony Orchestra. Ensembles who have performed her work include EXAUDI Vocal Ensemble, the London Sinfonietta, I Musici de Montréal, Ensemble Plus-Minus, Ensemble contemporain de Montréal, and Continuum Contemporary Music.

She has ongoing artistic relationships with the soprano Juliet Fraser and the Canadian string quartet Quatour Bozzini, for whom she wrote the pieces About Bach (2015), Leaving (2011), Warblework (2011) and Just So (2008/2018). These four works were released as an album by the label Another Timbre in 2018, alongside a second album of her orchestra and ensemble music.

From 2010 to 2013, Miller also was artistic director of the concert series "Innovations en concert" in Montreal. Miller moved to London to take up the post of Associate Head of Composition (Undergraduate) at the Guildhall School of Music and Drama in September 2018.

In July 2022 her Viola Concerto, commissioned by Lawrence Power, was performed for the first time at the BBC Proms in London.

Use of transcription 
Miller often bases her work on pre-existing music, for example: a computer transcription of Kurt Cobain singing the folk song "Where Did You Sleep Last Night?", in For Mira (2012), written for violinist Mira Benjamin, a recording of Maria Callas singing "Vissi d’arte" from Puccini's opera Tosca in Bel Canto (2010), and a recording of an anonymous mbira player from Mozambique in Philip the Wanderer (2012).

Her work takes these transcriptions as starting points, investigating her response to the music through processes of repetition and looping. Often the source material is unrecognisable in Miller's finished works.

Her works employ musical notation, but also sometimes recordings of the source music, which performers learn by memory, such as a recording of the blues singer Maria Muldaur, which Miller uses in her piece Guide (2013).

Selected works 
 Viola Concerto (2022)
 La Donna (2021) for orchestra, commissioned by L'Auditori from Barcelona 
 Round (2017) for orchestra, for the Toronto Symphony Orchestra
 Tracery (2017–2018) for voice and tape, in collaboration with Juliet Fraser
 Tracery : Handanger (2017)
 Tracery : Lazy, Rocking (2017)
 Tracery : The Slits (2017)
 Tracery : attending to a task (2018)
 Traveller Song (2017) for ensemble, for Plus Minus
 About Bach (2015) for string quartet
 Duet for cello and orchestra (2015) for Charles Curtis and the BBC Scottish Symphony Orchestra at Techtonics Festival
 Guide (2013) for vocal ensemble, for EXAUDI
 Philip the Wanderer (2012) for piano
 For Mira (2012) for solo violin
 Leaving (2011) for string quartet
 Warblework (2011) for string quartet
 Bel Canto (2010) for mezzo-soprano and ensemble
 A Large House (2009) for orchestra, for the Janácěk Philharmonic at the Ostrava New Music Days
 Just So (2008/2018) for string quartet 
 O Zomer! (2007) for the Asko Ensemble 
 Orfeo (2006) for ensemble
 Dry Bones (1998), for eight timpani, bass drum, viola and cello
 Through night and day and in and out of weeks and almost over a year (1998) for two recorders, prepared cello and three prepared double basses

References 

Living people
1976 births
Musicians from Vancouver Island
Experimental composers
21st-century Canadian composers
Canadian expatriates in England
University of Victoria alumni
Royal Conservatory of The Hague alumni
Jules Léger Prize for New Chamber Music winners
21st-century women composers
Academics of the Guildhall School of Music and Drama
Canadian classical composers
Women classical composers
21st-century classical composers
Canadian women composers
21st-century Canadian women musicians